Ham Street railway station is a Grade II listed stop on the Marshlink line in the village of Hamstreet, Kent, between  and . Services are provided by Southern.

Location
The station is on a dual-track section of the unelectrified Marshlink Line. Train services are provided by Southern and operated by Class 171 Turbostar diesel trains.

The booking office - open on Mondays to Saturdays mornings - is located in the main station building on the Ashford-bound platform. The two PERTIS passenger-operated self-service ticket machines - one on each platform - have now been removed and replaced with Ticket Vending machines on each platform, which allows a ticket to be purchased from any origin, as opposed to just from Ham Street. The PERTIS passenger-operated self-service machines were installed in connection with a Penalty Fares Scheme in 2008.

History
The station was built by the South Eastern Railway as one of four original stops on the line from Ashford to Hastings (the others being ,  and ). It opened on 13 February 1851. A goods station was added later in the year.

The original name was Ham Street. It was renamed to Ham Street & Orlestone on 1 February 1897, and then reverted to Ham Street in 1976. It was Grade II listed in 2005.

Along with several other stations on the line, Ham Street opened with staggered platforms, allowing a crossing across the railway from one to the other. After several accidents and near misses, a temporary footbridge was provided in 2014, replacing the previous flat crossing of the railway. It was replaced by a permanent bridge in 2017.

Services
All services at Ham Street are operated by Southern using  DMUs.

The typical off-peak service in trains per hour is:
 1 tph to  via 
 1 tph to 

Previously, westbound trains ran as an express service to  although this was changed to a stopping service to Eastbourne in the May 2018 timetable change.

References 
Citations

Sources

External links

Railway stations in Kent
Grade II listed railway stations
DfT Category E stations
Transport in the Borough of Ashford
Former South Eastern Railway (UK) stations
Railway stations in Great Britain opened in 1851
Railway stations served by Govia Thameslink Railway
1851 establishments in England